The Eleventh House was a jazz fusion group of the 1970s, led by the guitarist Larry Coryell. The band was formed in 1972 and disbanded in 1975. Other members included Mike Mandel (keyboards) and Alphonse Mouzon (drums). The band recorded their first album entitled Introducing Eleventh House with Larry Coryell in 1973, followed by Live in Montreux and Level One in 1974.  The final album of their first incarnation,  Aspects  was released in 1976.

The band reunited in 2012 for some concerts and recorded a studio album Seven Secrets prior to Coryell's death on February 19, 2017.
Coryell and Mouzon recorded two studio albums Back Together Again (Atlantic, 1977) and The 11th House (Pausa, 1985), whose personnel included former The Eleventh House members.

Discography

Studio albums
 Introducing The Eleventh House with Larry Coryell (Vanguard, 1974)
 Level One (Arista, 1975)
 Aspects (Arista, 1976)
 Seven Secrets (Savoy, 2017)

Live albums
 Larry Coryell & The Eleventh House At Montreux (Vanguard, 1978 Recorded July 4, 1974)
 Larry Coryell & The Eleventh House January 1975 (2014)
 Live At The Jazz Workshop (July 1975) (2015)
 The Funky Waltz (Jazz Workshop, Boston 1973) (2016)

References

American jazz ensembles from New York City
Jazz fusion ensembles